George Granville Francis Egerton, 2nd Earl of Ellesmere (15 June 1823 – 19 September 1862), styled Viscount Brackley between 1846 and 1857, was a British peer and Conservative politician from the Egerton family.

Egerton was the eldest son of Francis Egerton, 1st Earl of Ellesmere and was educated at Christ Church, Oxford and Trinity College, Cambridge. On 29 April 1846, he married Lady Mary Campbell (a daughter of the 1st Earl Cawdor) and they had two sons, Hon. Francis Charles Granville (1847–1914) and Hon. Alfred John Francis (1854–1890), Member of Parliament for Eccles.

In 1847, Lord Brackley became Member of Parliament for North Staffordshire and held the seat until 1851 when he resigned due to ill health.  In 1857, he inherited his father's titles and on his own death in 1862, was succeeded by his eldest son, Francis.

References

External links

1823 births
1862 deaths
Earls in the Peerage of the United Kingdom
Conservative Party (UK) hereditary peers
Egerton, George
Egerton, George
UK MPs who inherited peerages
Egerton, George, 2nd Earl of Ellesmere
George
George
Fellows of the Royal Society
Alumni of Christ Church, Oxford
Alumni of Trinity College, Cambridge